The North Ship is the debut collection of poems by Philip Larkin (1922–1985), published in 1945 by Reginald A. Caton's Fortune Press. Caton did not pay his writers and expected them to buy a certain number of copies themselves. A similar arrangement had been used in 1934 by Dylan Thomas for his first collection.

Some of the poems were composed while Larkin was an undergraduate at the University of Oxford, but the bulk were written in the period 1943 to 1944 when he was running the public library in Wellington, Shropshire, and writing his second novel A Girl in Winter.

The volume was published again, in 1966, by Faber and Faber Limited. In the 1945 version there are 31 items, numbered with Roman numerals. The last of these, "The North Ship" is a set of five poems tracking a ship's northward progress. Of the 30 single poems, only seven have titles. In the 1966 reissue an extra poem, "Waiting for breakfast, while she brushed her hair" was added at the end. This edition is still in print.

The North Ship constitutes the first part of the 2003 edition of Larkin's Collected Poems.

Content 
The book contains 32 poems:
Ellipsis (...) indicates first line of an untitled poem

See also

List of poems by Philip Larkin – a complete list of all the known poems, both published and unpublished, and their date of composition

References

English poetry collections
1945 poetry books
Poetry by Philip Larkin